José Pascual Alba Seva (born 2 April 2000), better known as Pascu, is a Spanish professional footballer who plays as a midfielder for Eerste Divisie club Almere City.

Club career
Pascu is a youth product of Valencia CF, and signed with ADO Den Haag on 24 August 2020. He made his professional debut with ADO Den Haag in a 4–2 Eredivisie loss to Feyenoord on 27 September 2020.

On 9 July 2021, he joined Dordrecht in the Dutch second-tier Eerste Divisie. After a successful season in which he made 37 appearances and scored once, Pascu signed a two-year contract with an option of an additional year with league rivals Almere City.

International career
Pascu is a youth international for Spain, having represented the Spain U18s at the 2018 Mediterranean Games.

References

External links

La Preferente Profile

2000 births
Living people
People from Baix Vinalopó
Sportspeople from the Province of Alicante
Spanish footballers
Spain youth international footballers
Footballers from the Valencian Community
Association football midfielders
Eredivisie players
Eerste Divisie players
Segunda División B players
Valencia CF Mestalla footballers
ADO Den Haag players
FC Dordrecht players
Almere City FC players
Spanish expatriate footballers
Spanish expatriates in the Netherlands
Expatriate footballers in the Netherlands